Wolfram Huhn (born 3 December 1973 in Würzburg) is a German rower.

References 
 
 

1973 births
Living people
Sportspeople from Würzburg
Olympic rowers of Germany
Rowers at the 1996 Summer Olympics
Olympic silver medalists for Germany
Olympic medalists in rowing
German male rowers
World Rowing Championships medalists for Germany
Medalists at the 1996 Summer Olympics
20th-century German people